Puressence is the first album by the English alternative rock band Puressence, released in 1996.

Critical reception
NME wrote that "this magnificent debut album – by turns both plaintive and gutturally anthemic – still stands as a towering miserablist masterpiece."

Track listing
All songs written by Mudriczki, Szuminski, Matthews and McDonald.
"Near Distance" – 4:39
"I Suppose" – 4:13
"Mr Brown" – 5:02
"Understanding" – 4:27
"Fire" – 4:05
"Traffic Jam in Memory Lane" – 3:16
"Casting Lazy Shadows" – 3:36
"You're Only Trying to Twist My Arm" – 4:27
"Every House on Every Street" – 4:03
"India" – 6:04

Personnel

Musicians
James Mudriczki - vocals
Neil McDonald - guitar
Kevin Matthews - bass guitar
Anthony Szuminski - drums

Technical 
Clive Martin - producer and engineer
Peter Anderson - Photography

References

1996 debut albums
Puressence albums
Island Records albums